The aortic nerve, also known as the aortic depressor nerve, is a branch of the vagus nerve. It supplies autonomic afferent nerve fibers to the peripheral baroreceptors and chemoreceptors found in the aortic arch.

Structure 
The aortic nerve is an autonomic afferent nerve, and runs from the peripheral baroreceptors and chemoreceptors found in the aortic arch. It joins the vagus nerve. This allows for impulses to reach the solitary tract of the brainstem.

Function 
The aortic nerve is part of the nerve pathway that allows for afferent impulses to be sent from the aortic arch to the medulla oblongata for control of the circulatory system.

History 
The aortic nerve was allegedly discovered by Jewish Russian-French physiologist Elias von Cyon and German physician Carl Ludwig.

References

Vagus nerve
Aorta